Trudovye Rezervy ( "Workforce Reserves") was one of the Voluntary Sports Societies of the Soviet Union. It was set up to involve in mass physical culture and select and train for sports of higher achievements young students of vocational schools, while higher education students were involved in Burevestnik ("Storm-petrel") society. The Trudovye Rezervy  society, like its sister organisations, had eponymous sports teams and facilities including:

Trudovye Rezervy Stadium may be 

 Trudovye Rezervy Stadium (Kazan)
 Trudovye Rezervy Stadium (Kursk)